LOR or Lor may refer to:

Science
 Loricrin, a protein of the epidermis
 Loss of resistance, in epidural anesthesia
 Lunar orbit rendezvous, a method used to land man on the moon and safely return

People
Lor, a native of Lorestan
 Lor, a speaker of Lori language
Lor, Cameroonian musician
 The Lady of Rage (born 1968), American rapper
 Lor family in the Gran Torino film, including
 Thao Vang Lor
 Sue Lor

Places
 Lor, Armenia, a town of Syunik province
 Lor, Aisne, a commune of the Aisne département, in northern France
 Lor, Gilan, a village in Iran
 Lor, Kermanshah, a village in Iran
 Lorton (Amtrak station), Virginia, United States
 Lindsey Oil Refinery, an oil refinery on the east coast of the United Kingdom
 Liverpool Overhead Railway, a closed Overhead railway in England
 Lucas Oil Raceway at Indianapolis

Other
 Lor (cheese), a traditional Turkish whey cheese
 LOR (Line of Route), a UK numbering scheme to refer to a point on rail route similar to Engineer's Line Reference (ELR)
 Laing O'Rourke, international construction company
 LiveonRelease, an all girl punk rock band
 Learning object repository
 Letter of recommendation
 Letter of reprimand
 Lord of the Rings Adventure Game
 Legends of Runeterra, online card game abbreviated as LoR